Schoppe is a surname. Notable people with the surname include:

Amalie Schoppe (1791–1858), German author
Caspar Schoppe (1576–1649), German scholar
James L. Schoppe, American production designer
Julius Schoppe, German painter
Martin Schoppe, German musicologist and painter